The Brooklyn Cruise Terminal is a cruise terminal in the Red Hook neighborhood of Brooklyn, New York City. It is located on land owned by the Port Authority of New York and New Jersey (PANYNJ) and leased by the New York City Economic Development Corporation (NYCEDC). The terminal is one of three terminals for ocean-going cruise ships in the New York metropolitan area. Ships from Carnival Corporation (which owns the Cunard and Princess Cruises) call the terminal their home port.
 
The Brooklyn Cruise Terminal is located at Red Hook Pier 12, on the south side of the Atlantic Basin at Pioneer and Imlay Streets. Vehicular access is through the main gate near the intersection of Bowne and Imlay Streets.

The terminal was converted from a 1954 freight terminal and was earlier the site of the Atlantic Basin Iron Works. The Brooklyn Cruise Terminal opened on April 15, 2006, following a $52 million investment by NYCEDC, with the arrival of the RMS Queen Mary 2. On July 15 and 16, 2017, the Brooklyn Street Circuit in the port and supporting roads hosted the Formula E electric car racing series's ninth and tenth round in the 2016–17 Formula E season.

See also 
 Port of New York and New Jersey
 Manhattan Cruise Terminal
 Cape Liberty Cruise Port

References

External links

Official website

Water transportation in New York City
Port of New York and New Jersey
2006 establishments in New York City
Red Hook, Brooklyn
Transportation buildings and structures in Brooklyn
Passenger ship terminals